Harpullia arborea is a tree in the family Sapindaceae that grows up to  tall. It is found from India and Sri Lanka throughout Southeast Asia and Malesia to Australia and the Western Pacific.

References

External links
Harpullia arborea (description)

 

arborea
Taxa named by Francisco Manuel Blanco
Taxa named by Ludwig Adolph Timotheus Radlkofer
Flora of Malta